
Year 120 BC was a year of the pre-Julian Roman calendar. At the time it was known as the Year of the Consulship of Manilius and Carbo (or, less frequently, year 634 Ab urbe condita) and the Third Year of Yuanshou. The denomination 120 BC for this year has been used since the early medieval period, when the Anno Domini calendar era became the prevalent method in Europe for naming years.

Osroene 

Beginning of the kingdom Osroene. The end of the kingdom is in 244 AD.

Events 
 By place 

 Europe 
 The Teutons and the Cimbri migrate south and west to the Danube valley where they encounter the expanding Roman Republic (approximate date).

 China 
 Retaliating against the Han conquest of the Hexi Corridor in the previous year, the Xiongnu invade the provinces of Youbeiping and Dingxiang, killing or capturing over 1000 inhabitants.

Births 
 May 21 – Aurelia Cotta, mother of Julius Caesar (d. 54 BC)
 Berenice III, reigning Queen of Egypt (d. 80 BC)
 Lucius Cornelius Sisenna, writer and politician (d. 67 BC)
 Verres, corrupt praetor (approximate date) (d. 43 BC)

Deaths 
 Hipparchus, Greek astronomer and mathematician, on Rhodes (approximate date) (b. c. 190 BC)

References